Untamable Angelique (French: Indomptable Angélique) is a 1967 historical adventure film directed by Bernard Borderie and starring Michèle Mercier, Robert Hossein and Roger Pigaut. It was made as a co-production between France, Italy and West Germany. It was the fourth in the five film series based on the novels by Anne and Serge Golon.

The film's sets were designed by the art director Robert Giordani. It was shot at Cinecittà Studios in Rome.

Synopsis
After discovering that her first husband is still alive, Angélique travels to the South of France not knowing that he is now a notorious pirate. Captured by some slave traders she is taken to Crete where she is intended to be sold.

Main cast 
 Michèle Mercier as Angélique de Peyrac 
 Robert Hossein as Jeoffrey de Peyrac 
 Roger Pigaut as Le Marquis d'Escrainville 
 Christian Rode as Le Duc de Vivonne 
 Ettore Manni as Jason 
 Bruno Dietrich as Coriano 
 Pasquale Martino as Savary 
 Sieghardt Rupp as Millerand 
 Poldo Bendandi as Angélique's buyer

Production
Michèle Mercier revealed that she got hurt during the gang rape scene: "Angelica is thrown into the hold where four prisoners are. They were inexperienced extras. They really rushed on me. I was terrified, I screamed. One of them hit me hard on the chest with his chain. For two years I had a lump in my breast. It was horrible!"

Box office
The film sold 4,610,585 tickets in France and Germany. It also sold  tickets in the Soviet Union, for a worldwide total of 29,410,585 ticket sales.

References

Bibliography
 Bergfelder, Tim. International Adventures: German Popular Cinema and European Co-Productions in the 1960s. Berghahn Books, 2005.
 Klossner, Michael. The Europe of 1500-1815 on Film and Television: A Worldwide Filmography of Over 2550 Works, 1895 Through 2000. McFarland & Company, 2002.

External links 
 

1967 films
1960s historical romance films
French historical romance films
Italian historical romance films
West German films
Films directed by Bernard Borderie
Films set in the 1670s
Films based on French novels
Films based on historical novels
Films based on romance novels
French sequel films
Gloria Film films
Films shot at Cinecittà Studios
1960s French films
1960s Italian films